The 1967–68 Houston Cougars men's basketball team represented the University of Houston in the 1967–68 NCAA University Division men's basketball season.  The team played its home games at Delmar Fieldhouse in Houston for the second consecutive season.  This season marked the team's ninth year as an independent member of the NCAA's University Division.  Houston was led by twelfth-year head coach Guy Lewis.

During the regular season, the Elvin Hayes-fronted Cougars defeated the Lew Alcindor-led UCLA Bruins on January 20 in what was known as the Game of the Century.  Houston attained a perfect 28–0 record for regular season, and finished with a 31–2 overall record, the first thirty-win season in program history.  The Cougars finished first in both major polls, were invited to the NCAA tournament, and finished as a semifinalist.  It was Houston's second consecutive Final Four appearance.

Following the season, Elvin Hayes was drafted into the National Basketball Association by the San Diego Rockets as the first overall draft pick in the 1968 NBA Draft.  Don Chaney was also taken as the twelfth overall draft pick by the Boston Celtics.

Roster

Schedule

Houston's regular season included the notable Game of Century against #1 UCLA.  With an attendance of 52,693, the game had the highest attendance of any basketball game at any level at the time.  It was also the first national broadcast of an NCAA basketball game in prime-time.  

|-
!colspan=7|Regular season

|-
!colspan=7|Bluebonnet Classic

|-
!colspan=7|Regular season

|-
!colspan=7|Rainbow Classic

|-
!colspan=7|Regular season

|-
!colspan=7|NCAA tournament

Rankings

Team players drafted into the NBA

References

NCAA Division I men's basketball tournament Final Four seasons
Houston Cougars men's basketball seasons
Houston
Houston
Houston